Zainab Qayyum also known as ZQ, is a Pakistani television actress, host, composer, and former model.  She was crowned the best model of the year in the Lux Style Awards (2004) and was given the Most Stylish TV Actress Award in the Indus Style Awards (2006). Qayyum has appeared in numerous Urdu television series and music videos, and is known for her comic and strong antagonist roles in television serials. Some of her notable performance include Riyasat (2005), Sarkar Sahab (2007), Yeh Zindagi Hai (2008), Jalebiyan (2014), Mohabbat Ab Nahi Hogi (2015), Lagaao (2016), Aangan (2017), Phir Wohi Mohabbat (2017). She made her film debut with a cameo in action-drama Sultanat (2014) and appeared as Lawyer in Jawani Phir Nahi Aani (2015).

Life and career 
Qayyum was born in Karachi. She did her O-Levels in Karachi, and then moved to Lahore to study for her B.A and M.A. She graduated from Kinnaird College with a master's degree in English literature. She taught in Lahore Grammar school for a year before joining Libas as an assistant editor. She worked there for two years while doing her Masters.

Qayyum received her first experience of modelling in 1991 when Vaneeza Ahmad asked her to help backstage for a fashion show, and being short of models, also told Qayyum that she would "go on the ramp." She has hosted a morning show on the Duniya News, and "Maachis", a talk show on Hum TV that focusses on real-life family issues.

Failed Marriage

She revealed she decided to tie the knot but since her intentions were somewhat competitive and all about being perfect, the haste and impatience led to her making a massive blunder.

“I got married in 2010. I used to see my friends getting pregnant and their kids growing old then I decided to get married because I thought it was the time to get married after getting the first proposal. It was a non-serious approach but still I tied the knot and moved to Dubai and shifted to London."

After just ten months of being together, ZQ’s husband decided that they are definitely not hitting it off. After 10 months of marriage, it was over, my husband realized that we had no compatibility and he called it off.”

Filmography

Film

Television

Other appearances 

Kabhi Na Kabhi
Kuch To Kaha Hota
Thora Thora Pyar
Bewafaian
Barsaath Raat Ki
Naa Jaane Kyun
Vasl-e-Yaar
Na Dil Dayti
Aitebaar
Aania
Chubhan
Dil e Majboor
Siskiyaan
Shiddat
The Celebrity Lounge

Talk show 
Maachis
Morning shows

Telefilm 
Dil Hi Jaane
Najar Lage Sayain
Bin Tere Keya Hai Jeena
Susr-in-Law
Shiddat
Meri Jaan

TV commercials
Pantene
Indigo by Jazz Pakistan
Dawlance

Music videos 

(2002) | Abrar-ul-Haq's | "Asaan Jana Malo Maal" 
(2016) | Ali Sher's | "Wohi Rastey" 
 Jawad Bashir's | "Dr & Billa" 
(2003) | Ali Zafar's | "Rangeen"

Awards and nominations 
 Best model of the year 2004 – Lux Style Awards
 Most stylish TV Actress – Indus Style Awards 2006

References

External links 
 https://www.scribd.com/doc/2257444/Interview-with-Zainab-Qayum
 http://www.mag4you.com/spotlight/Zainab+Qayum/4032.htm
 http://www2.jumptv.com/seo/Maachis/Maachis.htm
 http://www.newsline.com.pk/NewsJune2001/newsliner2.htm

1975 births
Living people
Pakistani television actresses
Pakistani female models
Pakistani Muslims
Pakistani television hosts
Actresses from Karachi
Kinnaird College for Women University alumni
Pakistani film actresses
Lux Style Award winners
21st-century Pakistani actresses
Pakistani women television presenters